Christophe Hansen (born 21 February 1982 in Wiltz, Luxembourg) is a Luxembourgish politician belonging to the Christian Social People's Party (CSV), of which he is Secretary-General.

Since September 2018, Hansen has been a Member of the European Parliament  for the European People's Party (Christian Democrats) and was elected second quaestor in January 2022. He has been EPP coordinator on the Committee on International Trade (INTA) since 2019 and was notably European Parliament rapporteur for the post-Brexit Trade and Cooperation Agreement with the UK.

He has also been a municipal councillor for Winseler since 2011.

Biography

Education 
After finishing his secondary education at the Lycée du Nord in Wiltz (1995-2002), he went on to study at Louis Pasteur University in Strasbourg, where he completed a master's degree in Geosciences, Environmental Sciences and Risk Management.

Hansen speaks Luxembourgish, French, German, English, Spanish and Dutch.

Political career

National politics 
Christophe Hansen has been a municipal councillor for Winseler since 2011.

In 2018, he was elected chair of the Christian Social People's Party (CSV) northern district committee, serving in that position until 2021.

He has been a member of the CSV national committee since 2018 and has been the party's Secretary-General since 2021.

European politics 
Christophe Hansen began working as an adviser for Astrid Lulling MEP in July 2007.

From January 2014 to May 2016, he was Environment Attaché at the Permanent Representation of Luxembourg to the European Union. He also chaired the Council Working Party on the Environment during the 2015 Luxembourgish Presidency.

In 2016, Hansen became an adviser on European affairs at the Luxembourg Chamber of Commerce, and Economic and Commercial attaché at the Embassy of the Grand Duchy of Luxembourg in Brussels. He worked in this role for almost two years, until August 2018.

From March 2017 to August 2018, Hansen was also a member of the European Economic and Social Committee.

Following her decision to run in the 2018 Luxembourgish general election, Viviane Reding gave up her seat as Member of the European Parliament to Christophe Hansen in September 2018. He was re-elected in the 2019 European elections, receiving the second highest number of votes nationwide.

Within the European Parliament, he works primarily on three committees:

 as a member of the Committee on International Trade (INTA)
 as a substitute on the Committee on Economic and Monetary Affairs (ECON)
 as a substitute on the Committee on the Environment, Public Health and Food Safety (ENVI)

He has been very active on these committees, serving as rapporteur on the European Parliament recommendation of 18 June 2020 on the negotiations for a new partnership with the United Kingdom after Brexit. He was also rapporteur on the proposal for a regulation of the European Parliament and of the Council of 16 December 2020 on the application of Union tariff rate quotas and other important quotas.

Under the Finnish Presidency, in his capacity as rapporteur, he negotiated an agreement with the Council on the directive on the quality of water intended for human consumption, which was finally concluded in 2020.

Hansen is currently working on three main issues:

 On the Committee on International Trade, he is rapporteur on the proposal for a regulation of the European Parliament and of the Council on foreign subsidies distorting the internal market. The report, which was published on 28 April 2022, provides for an instrument to counter foreign companies benefiting from domestic subsidies in amounts that prevent competition by European companies.
 On the Committee on Economic and Monetary Affairs, he is shadow rapporteur for his political group on green bonds. The aim is to promote green bonds while ensuring strict supervision, particularly on matters of transparency.
 On the Committee on the Environment, Public Health and Food Safety, he is rapporteur on the proposal for a regulation on deforestation-free supply chains, which aims to reduce the EU's impact on global deforestation by adopting a clear legal framework.

On 18 January 2022, he was elected second European Parliament quaestor after receiving 576 out of 676 votes in the first round.

Personal life 
Christophe Hansen is married and has two children.

References

Living people
1982 births
MEPs for Luxembourg 2014–2019
MEPs for Luxembourg 2019–2024
Christian Social People's Party MEPs
Christian Social People's Party politicians